The 1932 Vermont gubernatorial election took place on November 8, 1932. Incumbent Republican Stanley C. Wilson ran successfully for re-election to a second term as Governor of Vermont, defeating Democratic candidate James P. Leamy and Socialist candidate Fred W. Suitor.

Republican primary

Results

Democratic primary

Results

General election

Results

References

Vermont
1932
Gubernatorial
November 1932 events in the United States